Wanted Dead or Alive is an American Western television series starring Steve McQueen as bounty hunter Josh Randall. It aired on CBS for three seasons from 1958–1961. The black-and-white program was a spin-off of a March 1958 episode of Trackdown, a 1957–1959 western series starring Robert Culp. Both series were produced by Vincent Fennelly for Four Star Television in association with CBS.

The series made McQueen, known for the concept of "cool" in entertainment, a television star. He would later cross over into comparable status on the big screen, making him the first TV star to do so.

Synopsis

Josh Randall (McQueen) is a Confederate veteran and bounty hunter with a soft heart. He often donates his earnings to the needy and helps his prisoners if they have been wrongly accused.

Although Randall is a bounty hunter, he doesn't chase and capture only men on wanted posters. He also settles a family feud, frees unjustly jailed or sentenced men, helps an amnesia victim recover his memory, and finds missing husbands, sons, fathers, a fiancée, a suitor, a daughter who had been captured many years earlier by Indians, an Army deserter, a pet sheep, and even Santa Claus. This variety, as well as his pursuit of justice and not just money, contributed to the show's attraction and popularity.

Except for a few episodes at the beginning of the series, Randall rode an energetic horse named Ringo.

Beginning with 1959 episode "Amos Carter", actor Wright King would appear in a supporting role as Jason Nichols, an eager young deputy sheriff turned bounty hunter. By the start of the third season, Nichols had been dropped. The episode called "The Partners", where Nichols killed three men that Randall felt could have been taken alive, is often considered the episode that broke up the partnership, although that was actually only the second episode with Wright King and long before the last episode he appeared in.

Cast

Main 
Steve McQueen played Josh Randall, the series's primary character, appearing in all 94 episodes.

Recurring

Guest stars

Episodes

Production

Development 
Vincent Fennelly and Four Star Television were considering a spinoff of their current series, Trackdown, which was itself a spinoff from Zane Grey Theater. At the time, McQueen's manager, Hillard Elkins, was also representing Trackdown star Robert Culp.  Elkins knew of the spinoff plan and suggested McQueen for the role. McQueen's style was exactly what Fennelly was looking for to fill the role.  Initially not interested in doing Westerns, McQueen agreed to the role based on his ability to connect with Fennelly and his vision for the role of Randall.  The pilot was filmed before McQueen did The Blob in 1958.

Four Star founder, Dick Powell, was initially hesitant about McQueen in the lead role, due to McQueen's short stature as well as his inability to ride horses, but he changed his mind after seeing early clips of the first episode.  It was Powell's idea to give the character of Josh Randall a gimmick weapon.

Prior to initial filming, Steve McQueen did not know how to ride horses and was forced to learn for the show's production.

McQueen had a reputation for being difficult to work with, and he fired three stunt men within the first day of filming, including Richard Farnsworth. Ultimately, that job went to Loren Janes, who also doubled for McQueen in a number of movies.

While the show and episodes are fiction, bounty hunters were common in the American West, and there is some historical basis for the stories.

McQueen's initial salary for the show was $750 per episode, but due to the show's popularity, that climbed to $100,000 per year, which was extremely high for the time. The timeslot change for the third season which ultimately ruined the show's ratings may have been CBS's way of killing the show due to ever increasing production costs.  Another factor was McQueen's strained relationship with Viceroy cigarettes, the show's sponsor.

The show helped launch the careers of several directors.

Writing
Writers included Samuel A. Peeples, Tom Gries and Charles Beaumont.

Filming
The premiere episode was filmed on the 20th Century Fox back lot in West Los Angeles and on location in Arizona, while the rest of the series was filmed at the Selznick Studios. A number of additional shooting locations were used, with the bulk of the outdoor action sequences shot on the famed Iverson Movie Ranch in Chatsworth, Calif., widely regarded as the most heavily filmed outdoor shooting location in the history of TV and the movies. A number of sets on the Republic Pictures backlot in Studio City, Calif., also appear in the series, notably the Western street and the Duchess Ranch set, which at the time of production on the series consisted mainly of a large barn, a main house and a bunkhouse.

The series made two very visible changes in the third season. McQueen's cowboy hat was switched out to one with an Arizona block, similar to the one that he'd recently worn in the smash hit movie The Magnificent Seven, but very different from the hat he'd worn in the first two seasons. The other readily apparent change was the opening titles. Instead of McQueen walking down a wooden sidewalk and ripping a wanted poster from a wall, the titles open with a black screen punctuated by bright flashes as Randall fires directly at the viewer then looms out of the darkness.

Music
The first season theme song was written and conducted by William Loose. It was replaced by a new theme titled "Wanted". This theme was used until the end of the series and was written and supervised by Herschel Burke Gilbert.

Colorized version
In December 1987, Four Star International colorized Wanted Dead or Alive, making it the first vintage television series to be completely colorized; the colorized version aired on at least 50 independent television stations.

Firearms 

Randall carries a gimmick rifle called the "Mare's Leg" in a unique quick-draw holster. The Mare's Leg was a shortened Winchester Model 1892 .44-40, with a gun belt that held .45-70 cartridges that, although they couldn't be fired from the weapon, looked more intimidating.  The gun itself was a real, working firearm rather than a prop, and had to be registered with the LAPD.

To learn the art of the quick draw, McQueen turned to Sammy Davis, Jr., whom he knew from working in New York.  Davis was known for being proficient with Western-style pistol work.

Three Mare's Legs were used in the series, differing in the shape of the lever and the barrel.

Themes 
Early television Westerns were aimed at a youth audience.  But by the mid-1950s, Western films and television began being made to attract an adult audience.  Wanted: Dead or Alive was one of the several shows that came to define the "adult Western" of the era, with an attractive leading character in the primary role.  Unlike many television Westerns of the era, Wanted: Dead or Alive focused on the action, rather than character development, and McQueen's method style was unique to the Westerns of the period.  McQueen's character was a man of few words and showed little emotion, often appearing to be more interested in the bounty hunter's reward rather than justice.

While most television Westerns of the time were of the classic genre, Wanted: Dead or Alive's Josh Randall was more of an antihero of the Revisionist Western genre.  McQueen had initially been reluctant to do a Western, but when the opportunity arose for the character to be less of the traditional hero, he felt he was able to bring more of himself into a realistic portrayal of the bounty hunter.

Release

Broadcast 
Wanted: Dead or Alive first aired on CBS on Semtember 6, 1958. It aired Saturday nights from 8:309:00 until September 1960.  From September 1960 until March 1961, it aired on Wednesday nights, 8:309:00.

Home media 
On June 7, 2005, New Line Home Video released season 1 of Wanted: Dead or Alive on DVD in Region 1.  In 2007, BCI Eclipse acquired the distribution rights to the series and released the final two seasons on DVD.  Season 2 was released on July 17, 2007, and season 3 on October 16, 2007.

In June 2009, Mill Creek Entertainment acquired the rights to the series under license from copyright holder StudioCanal, and have subsequently re-released the first two seasons. On August 25, 2009, they released an 11-disc box set featuring all 94 episodes of the series on DVD.

Reception
Initially, the show was popular with audiences, but not popular with critics.  A review in Variety, September 10, 1958 noted that McQueen's characterization of the bounty hunter was "almost stuffy in its allegiance to the breed... Acting is ok. It's obvious what the half-hour needs is scripting and perhaps some cleaner direction."  However, by the third season, the ratings had crashed, some of which can be attributed to the change from its original Saturday night timeslot to Wednesday nights directly opposite the popular series, The Adventures of Ozzie and Harriet.

Ratings

1986 film 
In 1986, New World Pictures adapted the series into a low-budget film of the same title; Rutger Hauer played modern-day bounty hunter Nick Randall, Josh's grandson.

Notes

  A. Eric Norden was unbilled for writing the episode "Tolliver Bender".
  B. Richard Donner was alternately credited for directing episodes.

References

External links
 
 Steve McQueen shooting an episode of Wanted: Dead or Alive on the Iverson Movie Ranch
 Iverson Movie Ranch: History, vintage photos.

1958 American television series debuts
1961 American television series endings
1950s American drama television series
American television spin-offs
Black-and-white American television shows
CBS original programming
English-language television shows
Television series by Four Star Television
Television series by CBS Studios
Television series by StudioCanal
1950s Western (genre) television series
Western (genre) television series featuring gimmick weapons
1960s American drama television series
1960s Western (genre) television series
Works about bounty hunters